Xenitenopsis jacoti is a species of beetle in the family Carabidae, the only species in the genus Xenitenopsis.

References

Lebiinae